Ascochinga Airport  is a public use airport serving the town of Ascochinga, Córdoba, Argentina.

See also
 List of airports in Argentina

References

External links 
 Airport record for Ascochinga Airport at Landings.com

Airports in Córdoba Province, Argentina